Blind Orion Searching for the Rising Sun is a 1658 painting by French artist Nicolas Poussin. Done in oil on canvas, the painting depicts a scene in which the mythological figure Orion — having been blinded — searches for the rising sun.

The painting's scene was inspired by the Assyrian writer Lucian's writings on Greek mythology, including the Orion legend. Poussin painted Blind Orion on behalf of Michel Passart, a well-known patron of landscape painting. Poussin's work is in the collection of the Metropolitan Museum of Art, which considers the work to be one of Poussin's greatest landscape paintings.

References 

1658 paintings
Paintings in the collection of the Metropolitan Museum of Art
Landscape paintings
Mythological paintings by Nicolas Poussin